Darwin Porter (born September 13, 1937, in Greensboro, North Carolina) is an American travel writer, producing numerous titles, mostly for the Frommer guidebook series, over a 50-year career span. In the 21st century, he became a pop culture journalist-historian, and celebrity biographer.

Early life
Porter was the son of Hazel Lee Phillips, a fashion designer, and Paul Suggs, an attorney. His stepfather, Numie Rowan Porter, adopted him and changed his last name. He grew up in Western North Carolina, moving to Miami Beach when he was ten years old. His mother was the wardrobe mistress and secretary for the renowned entertainer, Sophie Tucker. As a young boy in Tucker's home, Porter first met  many of the stars he would later write about — Marilyn Monroe, Ronald Reagan, Victor Mature, Richard Widmark, Frank Sinatra, and Elizabeth Taylor, plus an array of other stars.
	
He attended the University of Miami, graduating in 1959. He was editor of the award-winning student newspaper, The Miami Hurricane, and president of the Florida Intercollegiate Press Association. As a student journalist, he obtained major interviews most notably with Eleanor Roosevelt. She befriended him and was instrumental in recommending him for a scholarship. He did interviews with Lucille Ball and Desi Arnaz, Tallulah Bankhead, Ted Williams, Bette Davis, Ethel Merman, Adlai Stevenson, and then Vice President Richard M. Nixon.

Career
In 1958, he joined The Miami Herald as an entertainment writer, book reviewer, and columnist. Later, he was appointed Bureau Chief of The Miami Herald in Key West, where he was a frequent visitor to Havana, writing about the growing tensions between the United States and Cuba. Once, he was taken into the hills to meet a guerilla fighter, Fidel Castro. In Key West, he conducted extensive interviews with Harry S Truman, who had made Key West his winter White House during his presidency.

	In Key West, he was befriended by playwright Tennessee Williams, who introduced him to a number of stars, such as Vivien Leigh, Marlon Brando, and Paul Newman, as well as such literary figures as Truman Capote, Christopher Isherwood, and Gore Vidal.  Porter would later write biographies of these personalities. In 2014, he would publish a biography, Pink Triangle, devoted to Williams, Capote, and Vidal.
 
	In New York in 1961, Porter was named vice president of Haggart Associates at the age of 24. Working with the company president, Stanley Mills Haggart, a noted interior designer, author, and magazine editor, they produced some of TV's most-watched commercials, specializing in hiring movie stars to sell their products. Haggart had the Pepsi-Cola account, the soft drink promoted by Joan Crawford. They also produced 20-minute musical shorts starring such entertainers as Lena Horne and Louis Armstrong.
 
	A world traveler, Porter, in 1969, wrote the first Frommer guidebook. (Before that, the series produced a $-a-Day series.) In terms of volume, he would write more travel guidebooks than all others, over a 50-year span. In the 1970s and 80s, and into the 90s, the Frommer guidebook series was the market leader. The books were published, over the years, by Arthur Frommer, Inc.; Simon & Schuster; and John Wiley & Sons.
 
	Porter also wrote and updated subsequent editions of travel guides for Lufthansa, American Airlines, TWA, Iberia Airlines, Greyhound, British Airways, SAS Scandinavian Airlines, American Express, TAP Air Portugal, Air France, and Alitalia.

	Porter is also a novelist. His first novel Butterflies in Heat was reviewed by James Kirkwood, Jr., the Pulitzer Prize-winning author of A Chorus Line, with “Darwin Porter writes with an incredible understanding of the milieu—hot enough to singe the wings off any butterfly.”  Butterflies in Heat was later adapted into the film, Tropic of Desire.

	Other novels include Marika, based in part on information gleaned from Porter's long association with German and Austrian stars such as Hedy Lamarr, Marlene Dietrich, and Greta Keller, the leading chanteuse of Europe during the 1930s. He also wrote Venus, a novel suggested by the life of the acclaimed diarist, Anaïs Nin. Other novels include Blood Moon, Hollywood’s Silent Closet, Razzle-Dazzle, Midnight in Savannah, and Rhinestone Country.

	In the 21st Century, for Blood Moon Productions, Porter has produced more Hollywood celebrity biographies than any other journalist, concentrating on iconic stars and personalities such as Marilyn Monroe, Howard Hughes, Elizabeth Taylor, Vivien Leigh, Laurence Olivier, Humphrey Bogart, Steve McQueen, Marlon Brando, Katharine Hepburn, Zsa Zsa Gabor, Peter O'Toole, Rock Hudson, Debbie Reynolds and her daughter Carrie Fisher, Linda Lovelace, Burt Reynolds, and Kirk Douglas.
 
	He has written biographies of TV personality Merv Griffin, singers Michael Jackson and Frank Sinatra, lawman J. Edgar Hoover and politicians — Bill & Hillary Clinton, Ronald & Nancy Reagan, Donald Trump, and the Kennedys.

	Porter is also the author of four books on film criticism and has written a series of exposés as part of Blood Moon's Hollywood Babylon series.
 
	These biographies, based on the compilation of firsthand, orally transmitted histories, have illuminated aspects of Hollywood history previously unknown to the general public. Some of Porter's works have been serialized by major broadsheet newspapers in the UK, including The Mail on Sunday. The Sunday Times defined Porter's biography of Marlon Brando (Brando Unzipped) as “Lurid, raunchy, perceptive, and certainly worth reading ... One of the ten best showbiz biographies of the year.”
 
	As a biographer, Porter has won numerous awards from, among others, the New England Book Festival, the Hollywood Book Festival, the Los Angeles Book Festival, the New York Book Festival, The Northern and Southern California Book Festivals, The Florida Book Festival, the San Francisco Book Festival, and the Beach Book Festival.
 
	His biographies and travel guides have been translated into many languages, including French, Italian, Dutch, German, Portuguese, Spanish, and Chinese.
 
	Most of his biographies were published by Blood Moon Productions (www.BloodMoonProductions.com), a New York City-based press directed by former New York Times reporter Danforth Prince, and distributed through the National Book Network (www.NBNbooks.com) and later, through Ingram (www.IngramSpark.com) and Amazon (Amazon.com)  Blood Moon originated as the Georgia Literary Association in 1997, adopting its current name in 2004.

Criticism 
According to "Paul Bellini at FAB Magazine", I love the Porter/Prince books. They are the biographies I dreamed about as a child. Bill &
Hillary is amazing and fascinating, the story of a young lawyer with intense ambition, who
met a young man with the same intense ambition, and how they both maintained political
careers while surviving scandal after scandal. There's all the regular stuff, like the impact of
Monica Lewinsky and the embarrassment it caused, and there is also the Vince Foster
story...which reads like a great, tragic, doomed love story, one that changed Hillary forever.
“Bill & Hillary brims with Washington gossip of the era, like when teenage Laura Bush ran
over and killed her ex-boyfriend, or the fact that the White House hid Reagan’s Alzheimer’s
so that he could finish his second term with dignity, even if he didn’t know where he was.
The Clintons are a modern political dynasty, like kings and queens of yore. Bill & Hillary,
So This Is That Thing Called Love is the story of how his charm, and her ability to command
respect have kept them in the political eye for over 25 years. Hillary ran for the Democratic
candidacy before, and lost to Obama, but this time she’s ready. Even if she doesn’t win, she
has earned her place in history, not just as a First Lady, but as a political legend.”

from "The Midwest Book Review":
“'James Dean: Tomorrow Never Comes' arrives on the 60th anniversary of the violent death of a young star that became a legend,
but if readers who are prior fans of other James Dean biographies expect this to be another rehash of information, they'd be
happily mistaken.
Much of its information has never been published before, because it offers new unauthorized details, uncensored information,
and also includes powerful, in-depth analysis of a supporting cast of contemporaries. Insights from a closeted TV producer
who first discovered James Dean, and others who interacted with him and often suffered from his mental swings and
murky sexual explorations add to and expand the existing popular literature on this icon.
From Dean's early TV career and his involvements with other actors and actresses to the truths about his sexual liaisons, the
parade of women who marched into and out of his life, and his frustrations in the industry, James Dean: Tomorrow Never
Comes makes for a vivid read especially recommended for prior fans of Dean's life and times.
Be forewarned: this audience shouldn't expect a light coverage. The in-depth survey, with its amazingly large cast of contemporaries
and characters, myths refuted and realities explored, and high-octane drama packs in over seven hundred pages
of detail, which may look daunting, but which offer a rollicking good read.
With so many facts and insights packing its pages, James Dean: Tomorrow Never Comes is a highly recommended book for
any who would uncover more facets of the life and times of James Dean.

From "Films in Review", re "LOVE TRIANGLE: Ronald Reagan, Jane Wyman, & Nancy Davis"
It has to be a reflection of modern technological advances, it can't be anything else: all the Blood Moon books, most of them several hundred
pages in length, are written by the same two people – Porter & Prince. I mean, how is that possible? Each book should have taken two
years. Well, it must be something to do with the ease of writing with WORD, combined with the extraordinarily easy access to information
on the internet. I’ve never seen a more thorough use of these modern breakthroughs than here.
And while the book has the feeling, at times, of collage, it's never any less than fun, and it's infinitely more substantial than a mere gossip
tome. I mean, I loved Kenneth Anger's Hollywood Babylon books (I had the pleasure of putting him up at my apt for a few days once, and
that was fun, too), but they (and this, at first glance) are nothing more than gossip. However, in their cumulative, lurid glow, like Weejee's LA
photos, the O’Toole bio becomes something more than what is on the surface – much, more, certainly than what Anger gave us. O’TOOLE
takes itself a level more seriously than gossip, and its text is informative, both about the British stage and the American screen.
In terms of glorious gossip, however, wait till you get (just as an example) to page 126. O’Toole is invited by Jules Buck, his friend and
business partner, to join him for drinks with two other friends, who turn out to be Ava Gardner (they meet in her suite at the Savoy Hotel in
London) and Burt Lancaster, neither of whom O’Toole had previously met, and both of whom had acted together in Robert Siodmak's THE
KILLERS. Their unexpurgated stories that evening are absolute jaw-droppers. Lancaster's bi-sexuality and Gardner's sexual appetites are
tossed away like everyday, casual knowledge. Their fast-flowing repartee and awareness of each other's sexual adventures pile on, paragraph
after paragraph, story after story, and it's heady stuff. Add in some bizarre here-say out of nowhere about Evita Peron, and it's a kinetic,
wonderfully written chapter. And there are plenty more to follow.
I mentioned this book to FIR's quirky film critic, Victoria Alexander, and after reading it she ordered the one on Elizabeth Taylor and said it
was just as good. Blood Moon has found a winning formula.

From the Midwest Book Review: “Love Triangle: Ronald Reagan, Jane Wyman & Nancy Davis may find its way onto many a Republican Reagan fan's reading shelf; but those who expect another Reagan celebration will be surprised: this is lurid Hollywood expose writing at its best, and outlines the truths surrounding one of the most provocative industry scandals in the world.
“There are already so many biographies of the Reagans on the market that one might expect similar mile-markers from this: be prepared for shock and awe; because Love Triangle doesn't take your ordinary approach to biography and describes a love triangle that eventually bumped a major Hollywood movie star from the possibility of being First Lady and replaced her with a lesser-known Grade B actress (Nancy Davis).

“From politics and betrayal to romance, infidelity, and sordid affairs, Love Triangle is a steamy, eye-opening story that blows the lid off of the Reagan illusion to raise eyebrows on both sides of the big screen.

“Black and white photos liberally pepper an account of the careers of all three and the lasting shock of their stormy relationships in a delightful pursuit especially recommended for any who relish Hollywood gossip.”

Published works

Frommer Country and State Guides to:
Anguilla, Aruba, Austria, The Bahamas, Barbados, Bermuda, Bonaire and Curaçao, the British Virgin Islands, Bulgaria, the Cayman Islands, Denmark, Dominica, the Dominican Republic, England, Finland, France, Georgia (USA), Germany, Great Britain, Greenland, 
Grenada, Haiti, Hungary, Iceland, Ireland, Jamaica, Maine, Martinique & Guadeloupe, Massachusetts, Morocco, North Carolina, Norway, Poland, Portugal, Puerto Rico, Rumania, Scotland, Sint Maartin/St. Martin, South Carolina, Spain, St. Kitts and Nevis, Sweden, Turks and Caicos, the U.S. Virgin Islands, and Wales

Frommer City Guides to:
Atlanta, Berlin, Boston, Charleston, Florence, Frankfurt, Geneva, Granada, Las Vegas, Lisbon, London, Los Angeles, Madrid, Munich, New Orleans, Paris, Rome, Rome, Salzburg, San Francisco, Savannah, Seville, Venice, Vienna & the Danube, and Zurich

Frommer Regional Travel Guides to:
Andalusia, the Bavarian Alps, the Canary Islands, Caribbean Ports of Call, the Caribbean, the Channel Islands (U.K.), Europe, 
Europe by Rail, the Faroe Islands,  the French Riviera, Great Britain, Key West & The Florida Keys, Miami, New England, Provence, Sardinia, Scandinavia, Sicily, and Spain's Costa del Sol

Frommer Portable Travel Guides to:
The Bahamas, Charleston (SC), Frankfurt, London, Paris, Puerto Rico, Rome, San Diego, Savannah (Georgia), and Venice

$-A-Day Guides, published by Frommer, to:
The Caribbean, England, Scandinavia, and Spain

Frommer Special Edition Guides:
Frommer's Caribbean Bargain Book, Frommer’s Dream Vacations, and Frommer’s Guide to Caribbean Cruises

Guides for Dummies, published by Frommer, to:
The Bahamas, the Caribbean, Europe, and France

The Irreverent Travel Series, published by Frommer, to:
Paris

The Day-by-Day Travel Series, Published by Frommer, to:
Florence & Tuscany

Novels
Blood Moon (1999)
Butterflies in Heat (1976)
Hollywood’s Silent Closet (2001)
Marika (1977), with its Dutch translation
De weg naar de Top (1977)
Midnight in Savannah (2000),
Razzle-Dazzle (1995)
Rhinestone Country (2002) 
Venus (1982)

Biographies
The Secret Life of Humphrey Bogart: The Early Years (1899-1931) (2003);
Katharine the Great—Hepburn, Secrets of a Lifetime Revealed (2004);
Howard Hughes, Hell’s Angel (2005);
Brando Unzipped (2006);
Jacko, His Rise and Fall—the Social and Sexual History of Michael Jackson (2007);
Hollywood Babylon—It’s Back! (2008);
Merv Griffin, A Life in the Closet (2009);
Paul Newman, The Man Behind the Baby Blues (2009);
Steve McQueen, King of Cool, Tales of a Lurid Life (2009);
Hollywood Babylon Strikes Again! (2010);
Humphrey Bogart: The Making of a Legend (2010);
Damn You Scarlett O’Hara, The Private Lives of Vivien Leigh and Laurence Olivier (co-authored with Roy Moseley, 2011);
The Kennedys, All the Gossip Unfit to Print (2011);
Frank Sinatra, The Boudoir Singer (2011);
Elizabeth Taylor, There is Nothing Like a Dame (2012);
J. Edgar Hoover and Clyde Tolson—Investigating the Sexual Secrets of America’s Most Famous Men and Women (2012);
Marilyn at Rainbow’s End—Sex, Lies, Murder, and the Great Cover-up (2012);
Those Glamorous Gabors, Bombshells from Budapest (2013);
Inside Linda Lovelace’s Deep Throat—Degradation, Porno Chic, and the Rise of Feminism (2013);
Pink Triangle—The Feuds and Private Lives of Tennessee Williams, Gore Vidal, and Truman Capote (2014);
Jacqueline Kennedy Onassis: A Life Beyond Her Wildest Dreams (2014);
Love Triangle, Ronald Reagan, Jane Wyman, & Nancy Davis (2014);
Peter O'Toole, Hellraiser, Sexual Outlaw, Irish Rebel (2015);
Bill & Hillary, So This Is That Thing Called Love (2015);
Donald Trump, The Man Who Would Be King (2016);
James Dean, Tomorrow Never Comes (2016);
Lana Turner, Hearts & Diamonds Take All (2017);
Rock Hudson, Erotic Fire (2017);
Carrie Fisher & Debbie Reynolds: Princess Leia & Unsinkable Tammy in Hell (2018);
Playboy's Hugh Hefner: Empire of Skin (2018);
Kirk Douglas More Is Never Enough: Oozing Masculinity, a Young Horndog Sets Out to Conquer Hollywood & To Bed Its Leading Ladies (2019).
Burt Reynolds: Put the Pedal to the Metal, 2019
Historic Magnolia House: Celebrity and the Ironies of Fame, 2018
Glamour, Glitz, and Gossip at Historic Magnolia House, 2019
Judy Garland & Liza Minnelli: Too Many Damn Rainbows, 2020
The Seductive Sapphic Exploits of Mercedes de Acosta, Hollywood's Greatest Lover, 2020
Marilyn: Don't Even Think About Tomorrow, 2020
Lucille Ball & Ricky Ricardo, They Weren't Lucy & Desi, 2021.

Film Criticism
Best Gay and Lesbian Films—The Glitter Awards 2005; Blood Moon’s Guide to Gay & Lesbian Film (2006 and 2007 editions); 
Fifty Years of Queer Cinema—500 of the Best GLBTQ Films Ever Made (2010)

Movie Scripts
A Simple Chemical Transfer (Voted as Best Industrial Film of 1977); Tropic of Desire (1977), starring Eartha Kitt, Matt Collins, Barbara Baxley, and Pat Carroll

Contributing Interviewee for Documentaries
Marlon Brando (2006), for German TV; Queer Icon: The Cult of Bette Davis (2010)

Commentator for Audio Tracks on DVD Releases of Classic Films:
The Call of the Wild (1935), starring Clark Gable and Loretta Young; Deadline U.S.A. (1952), starring Humphrey Bogart and Ethel Barrymore; The Rains of Ranchipur (1955), starring Lana Turner and Richard Burton

References

Living people
American travel writers
American male non-fiction writers
University of Miami alumni
American columnists
1937 births
Writers from North Carolina
People from Miami Beach, Florida
American gay writers
21st-century LGBT people